Richard Nugent, Lord Delvin (1742 – 6 August 1761) was an Irish duellist and Member of Parliament.

Nugent was the eldest son and heir of Thomas Nugent, 6th Earl of Westmeath and adopted the courtesy title of Lord Delvin in 1754 when his father acceded to the earldom.

In 1759, he was elected Member of Parliament for Fore, although he was underage. He was also commissioned a cornet in the 1st Regiment of Dragoons.

In July 1761 aged only 19, the drunken Lord Delvin accosted a female acquaintance of Capt. George Reilly, and was challenged to a duel. The two crossed swords in the music room at Marlborough Bowling Green, and Delvin was mortally wounded. The incident led to the abandonment of Marlborough Green as a fashionable resort.

Further reading
Irish Varieties A more detailed account of the circumstances preceding the duel which ended Delvin's life.

References

1742 births
1761 deaths
Irish soldiers in the British Army
Irish duellists
1st The Royal Dragoons officers
British courtesy barons and lords of Parliament
Duelling fatalities
Heirs apparent who never acceded
Irish MPs 1727–1760
Politicians from County Westmeath
Members of the Parliament of Ireland (pre-1801) for County Westmeath constituencies